Maria Rydqvist (born 22 March 1983) is a Swedish cross-country skier. Her best World Cup finish is third in a 4 × 5 km relay event in Sweden in 2007.

Rydqvist's best individual finish at the FIS Nordic World Ski Championships was fourth in the 10 km freestyle in Falun in 2015.

Cross-country skiing results
All results are sourced from the International Ski Federation (FIS).

World Championships
 1 medal – (1 silver)

World Cup

Season standings

Team podiums
 4 podiums – (4 )

References

External links
Official website

1983 births
Living people
Swedish female cross-country skiers
Tour de Ski skiers
FIS Nordic World Ski Championships medalists in cross-country skiing
People from Gislaved Municipality
21st-century Swedish women